Nandamuri Taraka Rama Rao (popularly known as NTR) was-sub registrar- turned- Telugu film actor-turned-entrepreneur-turned-politician who served as the Chief Minister of Andhra Pradesh for three terms. He was the first non-Congress Chief Minister of Andhra Pradesh, representing the Telugu Desam Party (TDP) founded by him in 1982. His first term lasted 1&1/2 years from January 1983 to August 1984. He was ousted in a coup in August 1984, but returned to power a month later, which marked the beginning of his second term. He remained Chief Minister for the next five years, completing his full 5-year term as Chief Minister. In 1989, his party lost in the assembly elections, and it was not until 1994 that he would become Chief Minister again. His third and last term as Chief Minister only lasted nine months, from December 1994 to September 1995, following which his son-in-law Nara Chandrababu Naidu took over the party and became Chief Minister.

The political priorities of NTR during all his three terms as Chief Minister were widely debated, with the right-wing parties accusing him of economic populism, the left-wing parties accusing him of diverting resources away from government employee benefits and his supporters arguing that they were worthwhile investments into infrastructure, human resource development and social net programs.

Economic policies
Divestment of non-performing state industry to private sector such as Allwyn Motors to Mahindra & Mahindra.
Economic freedom for Telugu people: NTR argued that all free people negotiating with each other, working hard and forming economic units that serve customers does not need over regulation from government. He felt government corruption was killing free enterprise. He passed the 1995 MACS (Mutually Aided Co-operative Societies) act and its results were visible in a few months and resulted in a copy law being passed at the national level. The Co-Operative societies acts had three phases 1932 British act, its goals was to weaken Indian enterprises by removing its leaders and converting them into entities that cannot raise capital. The 1932 act was reformed in 1964 which ironically made it worse. It nationalized all the co-operative societies and restricted ownership to just the government. Thriving societies from before 1932 with private capital became zombie entities after 1932, attempt to invest govt money into them and nationalizing them made it worse by imposing bureaucracy costs and capital raise regulations. NTR offered these societies to be fully free to raise and use capital as they please as long as they pay back all the govt investment into them. This immediately re-invigorated the small and medium entrepreneur, especially the rural women. Milk production, egg production took off. Lots of rural poor got organized into co-operative societies free of govt corruption. United Nations picked up this law and made it a model for rural self help economics globally
Strong states with a stronger center economic model initiated by NTR approved by the country.

Education policies 

He was obsessed with competitiveness of Telugu population in the world. He created a broad direction and implemented it under the able leadership of an educator Gali Muddu Krishnama Naidu. His direction was driven by considerations of a) future b) fairness c) economic competitiveness. On future he saw education is the vehicle for social transformation especially for the socially dis-advantaged and women. On fairness, expanding access to the best educational opportunities to the most deserving was seen as a vehicle for improving efficiency of the entire society. On Competitiveness, he observed that Telugu economy will one day be big and be mostly about serving Telugu population needs and in this economy a local advantage to local people will only happen if education was primarily in Telugu. He also observed that wealth would need trade and uniquely Telugu products sold outside will be the most valuable trade hence, preserving unique Telugu cultural advantages need to be enhanced with education. He also observed that trading with the world will be important and learning other languages would have to be an essential part of primary education especially English and Hindi. He pushed back on the argument that the rich in Telugu lands are doing it right by sending their kids to private English medium schools by saying, this behavior is a symptom of our desperation and past failures not a path for future success. He proposed a three-point formula for addressing this issue: i) Make all local government jobs/educational institution entrances and business to be in Telugu and Urudu so local kids have an inherent advantage and local private schools will have to teach Telugu ii) invest and revamp Telugu academy to continuously translate all the latest knowledge from around the world into Telugu iii) improve government schools and introduce English and Hindi as additional compulsory subjects like the other non-English speaking European countries. He subscribed to the modern European educational concept that learning in mother tongue is always easier than in a language used solely at school. The only future in which being solely educated in a foreign language will be helpful is a future where Telugu people cannot create an economy that provides for Telugu needs.     
Overhauled the entire state's education syllabus for schools. He instituted statewide entrance examinations for all disciplines of higher education vis-à-vis Engineering and Medicine to name a few called EAMCET (Engineering and Medical Common Entrance Test). Students, based on the merit of their ranks obtained in these tests, could join any state college of their choice. He banned capitation fee based admissions in higher education.
 NTR believed learning as life long pursuit and wanted to create an opportunity for women to get back into workforce post child rearing, wanted educational opportunity for working professionals whose education was interrupted for financial reasons. He founded Open University with excellent distance learning capabilities. The university became the most popular university measured by attendance.
NTR banned government school teachers from running private tuition institutions on the side. State government teachers union called for a strike and threatened to ruin an entire academic year for the students. NTR used NGO (Non-Gazetted Officers) core to conduct exams on time across the state and did not budge on his ban.His term was the first term since independence where exams were always on time and there were never any grace marks for failing students.
Andhra Pradesh Residential Education Institutions Society founded in 1972 with two institutes was revamped under NTR's government in 1988 with the passing of "G.O.Ms.No.363, Education (SSE.I) Department". The institutions were founded to provide exemplary Rural and Socially disadvantaged youth with good primary education. NTR reforms to this institution expanded the number of facilities to 220, made them directly administered by Minister of Education, with a 22-member board to guide the institution. The institution especially APRJC( Andhra Pradesh Residential Junior Colleges) flourished and ended up sending five times more students to elite institutions such as IITs and BITS, making Andhra the only state that produces so many elite experts with Rural and Disadvantaged backgrounds.  
NTR founded the Sri Padmavati Mahila Visvavidyalayam in Tirupati with the charter of expanding primary education for women in the state.

Legislations
After getting elected in 1983 his first legislation was the passing of Andhra Pradesh upa lok pal (civil society OMBUDSMAN) bill inspired by Scandinavian laws.  The A.P. Lokayukta Act 11 of 1983 came into force with effect on 1 November 1983 The law allows any citizen to start an investigation of any person in power (including chief minister himself) with the help of Judiciary, lawyers, community leaders and independent investigators. 
Successfully modifying the Hindu-Succession-Act to give equal default property inheritance rights for women.
 1983 DWCRA Law for rural women empowerment: Development of Women and Children in Rural Areas was a 1983 pilot project in 50 districts across India. It was mostly a failure every where except Andhra Pradesh. In Andhra Pradesh it caught the imagination of NTR and he tasked his political party cadre to recruit and organize small business women. This activity was completely neglected every where except in Andhra Pradesh it was just one more task assigned to the collector's office without any accountability. It was a big hit in Andhra. It lack of success every where except in Andhra made the program slowly vanish at national level only to be revived by NTR again in 1995. The key component of encouraging NGOs to be the organizer of rural women into 10 -20 group economic units was the lesson from Andhra that became a national model. The programs success inspired his successor Nara Chandra Babu Naidu to make this program one of his pet programs. He regularly checks the economic health of these micro units and waives any debt burden that is making them in-effective. The program got super charged under Y.S. Rajashekar reddy with his subsidized interest program pavala vaddi (3% interest loans). It is now a standard non-partisan part of Andhra's rural upliftment plans.
Passed Prohibition Legislation and dissolved government manufacture of cheap alcohol aimed at the mass market segment.
NTR reduced the retirement age for government employees to 55 from 58. He used the National Security Act (NSA) to successfully crack down on the general strike called by government employee unions demanding bringing state government employees to central government employee pay levels.  He furloughed the entire work force of Housing Construction Corporation a state government organization will fully pay till retirement claiming they did absolutely no work and that closing that organization would save money even if the state gave the employees free salaries. He claimed the secretariat employees got in the way of doing people's business and moved his office to a private ashram outside the city.
He successfully audited and brought the actual implementation of local body reservations program (for women, scheduled castes and scheduled tribes) compliant with the law. Even though the law was passed 15 years before he came to office, it was never fully implemented. He successfully passed 55% reservations for backward castes in professional educational institutes but was rebuked by the High Court and was forced to withdraw the legislation.
NTR abolished Patel-Patwari system which was based on inheritance that dominated Telangana.
NTR successfully repealed the Andhra Safe Road Transport Act that nationalized private bus services saying he wanted to encourage small business allowing for private buses to compete with government road transport. He changed the mandate of government transportation to provide road service for under-served markets (villages). Every village got road service during his tenure. He was however unable to deliver on his promise to relax the 1976 Urban Land Ceiling Act and 1975 Agricultural Land Ceiling Act. He argued that the land ceiling act interfered with small local entrepreneurs but was providing case by case exemptions to the politically connected and multi-national-corporations.
NTR abolished the legislative council calling it an un-productive expense to the exchequer, an un-elected un-representative body used to distribute political favors to out-of-work politicians.

Welfare policies 

/kg rice for agricultural labourers with less than  income per month (forty cents per day).
NTR introduced a mid-day-meal program for primary school children from families earning less than Rs. 500/month.
He guaranteed one light bulb per household to give educational opportunities to the lowest economic class of rural Andhra Pradesh.
He started a low-income housing project and built 500,000 houses in five years to replace thatched houses. The program continued for nine more years under his successor Chandrababu Naidu and added another 1 million homes. The program continues to this day under the incumbent Kiran Kumar Reddy government.
NTR offered subsidized electricity to peasants (farmers earning less than Rs 12000/yr) at Rs 50/year for all the power used by a single pump set.
Introduced subsidized clothing scheme for women with household incomes less than Rs 500/month and procured the needed clothing from APCO (Andhra Pradesh Co-Operative society for traditional weavers).

Irrigation 
NTR initiated the largest investment into irrigation systems in Andhra Pradesh since independence with the Telugu Ganga Project designed to turn Rayalaseema fertile and green and provide drinking water to Chennai. The Indian spiritual guru Sri Sathya Sai Baba supported and provided assistance to this project. While the state resources of the time did not support a large scale irrigation revolution, NTR personally met with and invited the legendary Mr.Kanuri Lakshmana Rao to revive a comprehensive thought process that went into national water management. While Mr.Kanuri Lakshmana Rao was a very ill octogenarian at the time, still created the blue print for the irrigation revolution that followed in the Telugu land. The key points of the comprehensive thought around irrigation were a) Southern rain fed rivers need to be linked with northern glacier fed rivers. This point was the core of NTR's contribution to irrigation, he unified the southern states around this idea and got Mr. Atal Bihari Vajpayee to declare Indian Rivers Inter-link his legacy project.  The core of the ideas relevant to the Telugu people here are i) Two medium scale projects be built to link western tributaries of Ganga to Godavari and Godavari to Krishna in Maharastra. These would allow the transfer of about 1500 TMC of water per year from glacier fed river to peninsular rivers north of the Telugu states so that Maharastra and Karnataka can leave the natural flows of Krishna and Godavari to Telugu lands. ii) Linking eastern tributaries of Ganga/Brahmaputra to Manahandi and Mahanandi to Godavari to transfer 700 TMC of water in the east from glacier fed rivers to peninsular rivers. b) This transfer of water will allow ancillary small projects (no major burden to Telugu exchequer) of linking Godavari to Krishna, Krishna to Penna and Penna to Cauvery along the eastern border all the way to Tamil Nadu. As preexisting coastal deltas get stabilized, additionally linking of Godavari to Krishna at Dummugudam will allow arid Telugu lands to get reliably irrigated. This will put an end to all water sharing issues between all states. With the natural flow of Godavari unimpeded, no reverse pumping projects will be needed in northern Telangana, with eastern Godavari, Krishna, Penna and Cauvery deltas stabilized via the coastal linking of Godavari and Mahanadi, Rayalseema and south/west Telangana will be well irrigated by natural flows of Krishna with small scale irrigation projects.  Eastern and Central Telangana will benefit from Dummugudam project. The politics of water sharing will be replaced with the productive work of water planning.
He reformed water distribution system from major reservoirs in the state by giving farmer organizations (raitu sangam) a say in planning.

Developmental projects 

NTR initiated the construction and upgradation of airports in Tirupati, Vishakapatanam, Vijayawada and Warangal. He initiated the investment study for three ports in Nellore, Machilipatnam and Kakinada.  He funded the construction of a rural road network, the total miles of road laid (22,000 miles) is more than half of all the state roads in existence till date.
NTR's upgradation of the road network and air connectivity to Tirupati and his key role in the National Front Government helped him push the funding of Radar Research Center in Tirupati with the mandate to provide outer atmospheric forecasting to significantly accelerate the weather forecasting capabilities of Andhra. Its three objectives were supporting Sriharikota into accelerating the launching of education satellites for rural education, enhancing water resource planning capability to reduce wastage of river water while providing reliable agricultural water supply and enhancing rural primary education with long-distance learning programs using edusat and televisions is primary schools across rural Andhra.
NFCL (National Fertilizer corporation of India) and GFCL (Godavari Fertilizer Corporation of India), were initiated and very rapidly went online during is first and second terms of NTR respectively. K. V. K. Raju made repeated references to NTR's support in creating a non-bureaucratic environment for the development of NFCL. Andhra's use of fertilizers went from being 71% of Indian National Average per hectare to 191% of Indian Average (which was also growing) during Mr. Rao's term. This tripling of technology use in the state's agriculture resulted in over 30% agricultural Productivity gains during his three terms. Such agricultural productivity gains were never observed since independence except during the period when Nagarjuna Sagar was commissioned.
He built the largest bus station in Asia at the time in Hyderabad, the Mahatma Gandhi Bus Station (MGBS) and commissioned the largest Buddha statue in the world at the time in Hyderabad to highlight the Buddhist heritage and history of Andhra Pradesh.
He adorned the Tank Bund road in Hyderabad with the statues of great Telugu personalities creating a sense of heritage and pride among Telugu people. It was part of his plan to make Hyderabad a destination for private corporate headquarters. Dredging and cleaning Hussain sagar was the first step, surrounding this beautified lake with public recreational spaces was the second step. Surrounding the public spaces with world class roads was the next step and finally providing for high rise urban offices, restaurants and cultural organizations was the plan. He accomplished it without much fanfare.
NTR put an end to annual communal rioting in Hyderabad during Ganesh Nimmajan.

Security 
NTR created a new commando force for the state and was very successful in combating naxalism both ideologically and militarily. Communal rioting in Hyderabad had been put to rest for good during his term.

Governance and other initiatives 

Visakhapatnam steel plant, which had been struggling since its foundation went online during his term, in no small part, due to his active lobbying with the central government.
He recruited worldwide medical talent and improved higher end medical capabilities of the capital city and founded a medical university in Vijayawada.
He reformed the administration of Tirupati and converted it into a modern tourist attraction. (Computerised registration and transparent board to run financial system.)
Complete computerization of TDP's organisation structure and building an organisational structure village by village to form a stable second party. He built a stable coalition of non-Congress parties at the state to give a clear two-party choice for the Telugu voter.
He did away with the feudal munusobu and karanam system to empower elected leaders of the local government. He introduced entrance exams for Vedic subjects and opened up priest positions in temples to non-Brahmins.
NTR founded a national political coalition of non-Congress parties called The National Front in 1989 and was elected its founding president. The National Front came to power at the centre the same year. His brain child of a highly federal party formed by a coalition of all the locally popular secular regional parties was successful and signalled the end of single-party domination at the centre.
NTR earned a seat for the poor in Andhra Pradesh at the centre via well-thought out political decisions. NTR extended un-qualified support (cleared an MP seat and did not field a TDP candidate) to Congress leader P. V. Narasimha Rao resulting in the latter winning from the state for the first time in his long career with a record majority. While the Congress wanted Rao to be a powerless un-elected (Rajya Sabha member) yes-man of the Nehru-Gandhi family, NTR actively made sure Rao had independent power. This earned Telugu people some influence even when Congress was in power at the centre. NTR formed an alliance with MP's from Tamil Nadu claiming that his Telugu Ganga Project will give Chennai water, making the Telugu Ganga project an interstate centrally funded project. His personal rapport with Venkaiah Naidu of the BJP also helped his influence at the central level. Hence, irrespective of who was in power at the centre, NTR and TDP were very influential in making sure the poor in Andhra Pradesh had representation during his tenure.
He was known for distinguishing Andhra Pradesh from its parent, the erstwhile Madras state, and gave it a distinct identity. Under his tenure, he shifted the Telugu film industry from Chennai to Hyderabad, giving it a distinct identity from Tamil cinema and benefiting Telugu film producers and distributors and theater owners in Andhra Pradesh.
 NTR followed in the foot steps of Kasu Brahmananda Reddy (Who passed GO 36 and resigned voluntarily to make way for P.V.Narasimha Rao – a Telanganite) and passed G.O 610 (requiring an audit and implementation of local reservations for telenganites) in December 1985 to be fully implemented by March 1986. He further fought a case against GO 610 in the high court and won!! the right for the chief minister to implement G.0 610. He followed up the court ruling with GO 674 (requiring repatriation of non-local government employees) to conform to GO 610. His support for P.V Narasimha Rao, as Prime Minister by helping him win outside Telangana as an MP were very instrumental is furthering his United Andhra Stand.
 NTR initiated large scale decentralization of governance and accountability with his Mandal Praja Parishads (M.P.P).The Mandal Praja Parishad as a democratically elected body at Mandal level was introduced by NTR (NTR re-coined a Mughal era term "Tehsil" or revenue district into Mandal). Tehsils which were run by bureaucrats with the sole responsibility of tax collections till that point were now bringing political empowerment to groups who had difficulty aspiring to hold state level political office (MLA, MP, ZPTC Chairman etc.,). The extensive 50% reservations for SC/ST/BCs in MPPs and the fact that MPP presidents were directly elected by people living in the Mandal made local govt responsive to local needs.
Pay cheques of category 3 or lower employees can be cashed only with a spousal signature, thus creating an explicit legal right for women in their spouse's earnings. (To avoid gambling and drinking away the check before the wife sees any money.) In addition, he modified the assigned lands act in 1987 to make it mandatory for all assigned lands to be on the name of the woman in the house and only in cases where there is no female in the household, it can be assigned to a male.

See also

 N. T. Rama Rao third ministry
 List of Chief Ministers of Andhra Pradesh

Bibliography

References

Chief Ministerships of Indian states
History of Andhra Pradesh (1947–2014)
1980s in India
1990s in India